Bian Jun (born 15 July 1977) is a former Chinese international football player who is predominantly associated with his time at Shanghai Shenhua where he won the 1998 Chinese FA Cup. He would initially start his career with Shanghai Pudong where he originally began playing as a striker before joining Shenhua where he was converted to a central defender where after spending the majority of his career he would move to Shanghai United before he retired.

Club career
He had won several caps for China National Team and China U-23 National Team and played for China in 1998 Bangkok Asian Game. He started his career as a football player in Shanghai Pudong and then he sparkled the interests from Shanghai Shenhua and finally made the switch in 1997. He made 159 appearances for Shanghai Shenhua and scored six times in a period that saw him win the 1998 Chinese FA Cup and 2003 league title. Unfortunately in 2013 the Chinese Football Association would revoke the league title after it was discovered the Shenhua General manager Lou Shifang had bribed officials to be bias to Shenhua in games that season. In the 2006 league campaign he was loaned out to Shanghai United where he played just 12 games before he declared his retirement from the game.

Honours
Shanghai Shenhua
Chinese FA Cup: 1998

References

External links

Player stats at sohu.com

1975 births
Living people
Chinese footballers
Footballers from Shanghai
China international footballers
Pudong Zobon players
Beijing Renhe F.C. players
Shanghai Shenhua F.C. players
Chinese Super League players
Asian Games medalists in football
Footballers at the 1998 Asian Games
Asian Games bronze medalists for China
Association football central defenders
Medalists at the 1998 Asian Games
Association football forwards